Tropical Storm Danielle caused considerable flooding in the state of Texas during September 1980. The eighth tropical cyclone and fourth named storm of the 1980 Atlantic hurricane season, Danielle developed from a tropical wave that emerged into the Atlantic Ocean from the west coast of Africa on August 22. Three days later, the tropical wave developed into a tropical depression. Four days later, the depression degenerated into a tropical wave. After tracking westward and entering the Gulf of Mexico, the system gradually developed, and became a tropical depression on September 4. The depression gradually strengthened and became Tropical Storm Danielle only hours before landfall in eastern Texas on September 5. Danielle steadily weakened inland and dissipated two days later.

Rainfall was heavier in Texas, peaking at 18.29 inches (465 mm) in Nederland. Much of the damage caused by the storm was as a resulting of flooding. In Port Arthur, twelve homes were damaged, while Interstate 10 was inundated by flood waters. Danielle also spawned several tornadoes in Texas, though none effects from them are unknown. Outside of Texas and Louisiana, the storm also dropped light rainfall in Oklahoma and Mississippi. Overall, Danielle caused three fatalities and at least $25 million (1980 USD) in damage.

Meteorological history

A tropical wave emerged off the west coast of Africa on August 22 and tracked westward across the Atlantic Ocean. On August 25, the system developed into Tropical Depression Eight. After four days, the depression degenerated back into a tropical wave, which continued westward across the Atlantic. By September 2, the remnants of the depression then interacted with a mid-level low pressure system over southern Florida. As a result, a low-level circulation developed in the Gulf of Mexico as the system as a whole moved off Florida later that day. The National Hurricane Center began issuing advisories a few hours later. Furthermore, the National Hurricane Center later noted that strengthening was more likely if the depression remained offshore for a longer period of time.

Between 0600 and 1100 UTC, a barge known as the Glomar Tender II recorded sustained winds of 60 mph (95 km/h). However, this measurement was deemed to be "small scale[d]" and not representative of the storm's actual intensity. At 1700 UTC on September 5, the National Hurricane Center upgraded the depression to Tropical Storm Danielle, based on observations from reconnaissance aircraft and an oil rig. A few hours later, Danielle made landfall near Galveston, Texas at the same intensity. The storm steadily weakened after moving inland and was downgraded to tropical depression by 1200 UTC on September 6. About four hours later, the National Hurricane Center discontinued advisories on Danielle. However, the storm did not dissipate until 1200 UTC on September 7, while located near Del Rio, Texas. The remnants of the storm continued westward for the next two days.

Preparations and impact

Texas

As the storm was approaching, the National Weather Service issued flash flood watches from Freeport to Sabine Pass, Texas. Due to heavy rainfall, an automobile accident in Beaumont resulted in one fatality. A police officer in Beaumont noted that almost every street in the city was flooded. The heavy rainfall resulted in considerable flash flooding in eastern Texas, causing residents to evacuate their homes. Flood waters also forced the shutdown of Interstate 10. According to a police spokesman, at least 60% of streets in Port Arthur were inundated by water. In Orange County, two people were injured in automobile accidents. Along Highway 124, a bayou overflowed its bank. Because there were numerous inundated streets, police barricaded roads in Beaumont, Bridge City, Orange, Vidor, and Port Arthur. A sewer system in Roscoe was also damaged by flood waters, leaving 1,500 residents without running water. In Port Arthur, twelve homes were reported flooded; one house in the Lakeview neighborhood had  of water inside. Flood waters entered an oil pit at Port Neches, which sent at least 200 barrels of oil into the Neches River.

Several boats and docks on Lake Buchanan were damaged. A third fatality from the storm occurred when a fisherman's boat on Sabine Lake capsized, causing the man to die of a heart attack during rescue. Danielle spawned several tornadoes in the state of Texas, one of which caused an estimated $1,500 (1980 USD) in damage to a storage barn in Galveston County on the Bolivar Peninsula. Another touched down twice in Beaumont and overturned a mobile home at a mobile home park. After the storm, the American Red Cross opened storm shelters for residents forced out of their homes because of the flooding. Due to adverse conditions, "hundreds" were left without electricity in Beaumont, Silsbee, Kountze, Hamshire, and Fannett. In addition, then President of the United States Jimmy Carter declared Jefferson and Nolan counties as disaster area, allowing those areas to receive federal aid. Damage in Jefferson County alone totaled to $2.7 million (1980 USD). Overall, Danielle caused two fatalities and between $25 million and $50 million (1980 USD) in damage within the state of Texas.

Elsewhere
In the Gulf of Mexico, rough seas from Danielle caused a maintenance barge to capsize, washing all 11 crewmen overboard. A fatality occurred when one of the crewmen drowned, though the other ten were rescued by the United States Coast Guard. Additionally, the storm also caused a United States Coast Guard helicopter to crash into the sea due to high winds and lack of fuel, though all twelve crewmen survived.

Danielle's effects on southern and eastern Louisiana was minimal. Light rainfall was also reported in Oklahoma and Mississippi, with no areas reporting at least  of precipitation.

See also

List of Texas hurricanes (1980–present)
Other tropical cyclones named Danielle

References

Danielle
Danielle (1980)
Danielle (1980)
1980 natural disasters in the United States
Danielle (1980)
Danielle